Phillip Leuluai (born 16 July 1977) is a former Samoa international rugby league footballer who played as a  or occasional  for the Salford City Reds in the Super League.

Background
Leuluai in Greenlane, Auckland, New Zealand. He is of Samoan heritage.

Playing career
An Otahuhu Leopards junior, Leuluai previously played for the Eastern Tornadoes, Newtown Jets and Cronulla Sharks.

He joined Salford City Reds on 27 August 2007 after their Aussie head coach Shaun McRae signed him on a -year contract for an undisclosed figure.

He joined the French club Lézignan Sangliers for the 2010/11 season.

Representative career
Leuluai represented Auckland in the 1997 Super League Challenge Cup, and Auckland South in the 1999 National Provincial Competition.

He toured Australia with the New Zealand Residents in 2000.

In 2002 Leuluai toured France and the United States with New Zealand 'A'.

Leuluai was named in the Samoa training squad for the 2008 Rugby League World Cup but did not make the final squad.

In 2009 he was named as part of the Samoan side for the Pacific Cup.

References

External links 
Salford City Reds profile
SL stats
Rugby League - Players
Phillip Leuluai Official Player Profile
Phillip Leuluai NRL Player Profile

1977 births
Living people
Auckland rugby league team players
Cronulla-Sutherland Sharks players
Eastern Tornadoes players
Junior Kiwis players
Phillip
Lézignan Sangliers players
New Zealand sportspeople of Samoan descent
New Zealand rugby league players
Newtown Jets NSW Cup players
Otahuhu Leopards players
People educated at St Paul's College, Auckland
Rugby league props
Salford Red Devils players
Samoa national rugby league team players